The 1965–66 SK Rapid Wien season was the 68th season in club history.

Squad

Squad and statistics

Squad statistics

Fixtures and results

League

Cup

References

1965-66 Rapid Wien Season
Rapid